The enzyme phosphoglycerate phosphatase (EC 3.1.3.20) catalyzes the reaction

D-glycerate 2-phosphate + H2O  D-glycerate + phosphate

This enzyme belongs to the family of hydrolases, specifically those acting on phosphoric monoester bonds.  The systematic name is D-glycerate-2-phosphate phosphohydrolase. Other names in common use include D-2-phosphoglycerate phosphatase, and glycerophosphate phosphatase.

References

 

EC 3.1.3
Enzymes of unknown structure